Vanja Zvekanov (born 25 May 2000) is a Serbian professional footballer who plays as a defensive midfielder for Javor Ivanjica.

Club career

Spartak Subotica
He continued the family tradition and started playing football at the age of four in FK Palić, where his father Zlatko was the coach. Then he moved to Spartak, where he was the captain of the cadets and a member of the junior national team of Serbia.

Genoa
In March 2018, he signed a contract for Genoa C.F.C., which he chose instead of another Italian team, Parma Calcio 1913. He arrived in Italy as a teenager and made 27 appearances in Primavera. In Italy, he was called the "new Matić", and then he suffered an injury that prevented him from playing in Serie A, what was the plan of coach Davide Ballardini.

Javor Ivanjica
In the summer of 2019, he returned to Serbian football and got a lot of minutes in professional football in the Super League. As soon as he came he played ten games for Javor in the first season. In that period Zvekanov scored two goals and had one assist in the Super League

International career
While playing for FC Spartak Subotica, Zvekanov played for the U17 national team of Serbia, and then he also played for the U19 national team of Serbia. In 2019, he was on the wider list of the U21 national team led by the coach Nenad Milovanović. He played with the youth national team in the qualifications for the European Championship in Northern Ireland, when they won a place for the elite round of qualifications in Italy.

Career statistics

Club

Honours
"Lajoš Vermeš" medal in Subotica in 2018. for sports feat of the year, proven football talent, persistence and going to Italian football.

References

External links

Vanja Zvekanov

Living people
2000 births
People from Subotica
Serbian footballers
Serbian expatriate footballers
Serbia youth international footballers
Association football midfielders
FK Spartak Subotica players
Genoa C.F.C. players
FK Javor Ivanjica players
Serbian SuperLiga players
Serbian expatriate sportspeople in Italy
Expatriate footballers in Italy